Protogygia is a genus of moths of the family Noctuidae.

Species
 Protogygia alberta Troubridge & Lafontaine, 2004 
 Protogygia album (Harvey, 1876) 
 Protogygia arena Troubridge & Lafontaine, 2004
 Protogygia biclavis (Grote, 1879)
 Protogygia comstocki McDunnough, 1934
 Protogygia elevata (J.B. Smith, 1891)
 Protogygia enalaga McDunnough, 1932
 Protogygia lagena (Grote, 1875)
 Protogygia milleri (Grote, 1876)
 Protogygia pallida Fauske & Lafontaine, 2004 
 Protogygia pectinata Lafontaine, 2004
 Protogygia polingi (Barnes & Benjamin, 1922)
 Protogygia postera Fauske & Lafontaine, 2004 
 Protogygia querula (Dod, 1915) (syn: Protogygia epipsilioides (Barnes & Benjamin, 1926))
 Protogygia rufescens Fauske & Lafontaine, 2004 
 Protogygia whitesandsensis Metzler & Forbes, 2009

References
Natural History Museum Lepidoptera genus database
Protogygia at funet

Noctuinae